Sir Hector James Wright Hetherington  (21 July 1888 – 15 January 1965) was a Scottish philosopher, who was Vice-Chancellor of the University of Liverpool from 1927 to 1936, and Principal of the University of Glasgow until 1961.

Early life
Hetherington was born in Cowdenbeath, Fife, and educated at Dollar Academy where he was school dux 1904 and 1905.

He studied at the University of Glasgow and at Merton College, Oxford.

Career
He was appointed Lecturer in Moral Philosophy at Glasgow in 1910, and Lecturer in Philosophy at the University of Sheffield in 1914, before becoming Professor of Logic and Philosophy at University College Cardiff (now Cardiff University) in 1915. He worked in the Secretariat of the 1919 International Labour Conference of the League of Nations in Washington, D.C. 

In 1920, he moved to University College Exeter as Professor of Philosophy and Principal of the College, and returned to Glasgow in 1924 as Professor of Moral Philosophy. In 1927, he became Vice-Chancellor of the University of Liverpool, but returned to Glasgow again in 1936, as Principal and Vice-Chancellor of the University. He served in this position for twenty-five years, retiring in 1961. 

He served as a Trustee of the Carnegie United Kingdom Trust and, ex officio, of the Carnegie Trust for the Universities of Scotland from 1936 until 1961. He was a Trustee of the Nuffield Foundation from 1943 until his death, serving as Vice-Chairman from 1961. 

In 1942, he visited the US as a British visiting adviser to American universities on wartime academic policy. In 1943 he became Chairman of the Committee of British Vice-Chancellors and remained as Chairman or Deputy Chairman until 1952. 

As a member of the Award Committee of the Commonwealth Fund he travelled widely, particularly in the United States and Canada, to promote links between British Universities and those in other countries. He received honorary degrees from 13 universities in the UK and North America. From 1930 to 1932 he was a member of the Royal Commission on Unemployment Insurance and in 1938 was appointed as Chairman of the Royal Commission on Workmen's Compensation. 

From 1940 to 1948, he was a member of the National Arbitration Tribunal and from 1951 to 1959 he was a member of the Industrial Disputes Tribunal.

Personal life
Hetherington married Mary Ethel Alison Reid (1886–1966) in 1914, with whom he had two sons. The elder son, Scott, became a senior civil servant in the Scottish Office, while the younger son, Alastair, went on to become editor of The Guardian. He retired in 1961 to Edinburgh. 

He was a member of the Athenæum, the Royal Scottish Automobile Club and Glasgow Golf Club. He was knighted in the 1936 New Years Honours List, and appointed Knight Commander of the Order of the British Empire (KBE) in the 1948 King's Birthday Honours List and Knight Grand Cross of the Order of the British Empire (GBE) in the 1962 New Years Honours List. 

He served as a Deputy Lieutenant (DL) for the County of Glasgow, and was made a Freeman of the City of Glasgow in 1961.

He is buried in a simple grave with his wife in the cemetery in Tillicoultry, just south-east of the war memorial. His younger son, Alastair, is buried beside them.

Published works
 With J. H. Muirhead. Social Purpose. George Allen & Unwin, 1918.
 The Life and Letters of Sir Henry Jones. Hodder and Stoughton. 1924.
 Letters to Graduates 1946-61. University of Glasgow. 1965.

References

1888 births
1965 deaths
People from Cowdenbeath
People educated at Dollar Academy
Alumni of the University of Glasgow
Alumni of Merton College, Oxford
Principals of the University College of the South West of England
Academics of the University of Glasgow
Academics of the University of Sheffield
Academics of Cardiff University
Vice-Chancellors of the University of Liverpool
Principals of the University of Glasgow
Knights Grand Cross of the Order of the British Empire
Deputy Lieutenants of Glasgow
Knights Bachelor